= PAN Foundation =

Medical humanitarian aid organization

Patient Access Network Foundation
- Founded: 2004
- Type: Non-profit
- Purpose: Patients' out-of-pocket expenditure
- Region served: United States
- Method: Direct aid Program funding
- CEO: Kevin L. Hagan
- Revenue: > US$451,000,000
- Website: panfoundation.org

The Patient Access Network Foundation (PAN Foundation) is a US-based non-profit 501(c)(3) organization that works to accelerate access to treatment through financial assistance, advocacy, and education. The organization was ranked #34 in Forbes' 2019 list of "top 100 US Charities", with private donations in 2019 totaling $434 million. And in 2023, PAN was named to Fast Company's third annual Brands That Matter list, which recognizes companies and organizations of any size for their relevance, cultural impact, ingenuity, and business impact.

Since 2004, the PAN Foundation reports it has given over $4.5 billion in financial assistance to over 1.2 million people, achieved major policy victories that increase access to care, mobilized thousands of patient advocates, and educated thoughts more on critical healthcare-related topics.

== Programs ==
The PAN Foundation operates financial assistance, advocacy, and education initiatives aimed at improving access to care. Through more than 80 disease-specific financial assistance programs, the organization reports serving over 100,000 patients each year across all US states and territories. According to the foundation, without this support, some patients would be unable to afford their prescribed treatment.

PAN advocates for change alongside its patient advocates and partners through policymaker outreach and education, research and polling within its Center for Patient Research, an annual Advocacy Action Summit that brings patients to connect with their elected officials on Capitol Hill, and campaigns and patient storytelling. In addition, PAN leads educational initiatives that focus on topics that are often hard to explain and even more challenging for people to navigate—including recent Medicare Part D reforms, clinical trials, the federal Extra Help program, alternative funding programs, and copay accumulators.

In 2024, PAN launched a new Opening Doors to Clinical Trials national initiative aimed at creating a movement to increase diversity in clinical trials.

== Leadership ==
In 2021, PAN appointed a new president and CEO, Kevin L. Hagan. The PAN Foundation is governed by a Board of Directors, composed of experts and seasoned leaders from the healthcare, financial, legal and policy communities.

== Controversy ==
In 2019, PAN agreed to pay $4 million to settle allegations with the US Attorney's Office that they violated the False Claims Act by "enabling pharmaceutical companies to pay kickbacks to Medicare patients taking the companies’ drugs."
